Harold Lee Scott Jr. is an American businessman who served as the third chief executive officer of Wal-Mart Stores, Inc., from January 2000 to January 2009. Scott joined Walmart in 1979 and under his leadership, the company retained its position as the largest retailer in the world based on revenue, although the company faced growing criticism during his tenure for its environmental footprint, labor practices, and economic impact. Scott has been a board member of Walmart since 1999, and served as chairman of the executive committee of the retailer's board of directors.

Scott was born and raised in Baxter Springs, Kansas and graduated with a Bachelor of Science degree in business from Pittsburg State University. He is married to Linda G. Scott and has two children. Scott was named to the Time magazine list of the hundred "most influential people" in both 2004 and 2005.

References

External links

1949 births
Living people
American retail chief executives
Directors of Walmart
People from Baxter Springs, Kansas
Pittsburg State University alumni
Walmart people

la:Lee Scott